Charles Tucker may refer to:
 Charles Tucker III, a fictional character in Star Trek: Enterprise
 Charles Tucker (politician) (1857–1928), Australian politician
 Charles Tucker (British Army officer) (died 1935), British Army General
 Charles Tucker (police officer) (died 1910), British police officer
 Charles Tucker (test pilot) (1919–2010), test pilot employed by Northrop
 Charles E. Tucker, Jr., retired Major General in the United States Air National Guard